Shalma may refer to:
 Shalma, Masal
 Shalma, Shaft

See also
 Shalma Kuh